Lasioglossum cire, also known as the Lasioglossum (Ctenomia) cire, is a species of bee in the genus Lasioglossum, of the family Halictidae.

References
 https://www.academia.edu/7390502/AN_UPDATED_CHECKLIST_OF_BEES_OF_SRI_LANKA_WITH_NEW_RECORDS
 http://apoidea.myspecies.info/taxonomy/term/6749
 http://animaldiversity.org/accounts/Lasioglossum_cire/classification/#Lasioglossum_cire

Notes

cire
Insects described in 1897